Halima Yusuf Atete also known as Halima Atete (born 26 November 1988) is a Nigerian film actress and film producer, born and raised in Maiduguri, Borno state. Halima Atete is well known in kannywood film industry for the role she always plays as the mischievous and jealousy-filled role. She joined kannywood in 2012, she made her debut in Asalina (My Origin) a film that she produced, after her appearance in several movies such as Kona Gari, Asalina, Dakin Amarya, she won best new actress at the City People Entertainment Awards in 2013, she was nominated by the London based news organization African Voice over her excellent performance in the entertainment industry.

Early life and career
Halima Atete was born in Maiduguri, Borno state. She attended Maigari primary school, she graduated from Yerwa government day secondary school. Halima obtained National Diploma in sharia and civil law. Halima Atete joined kannywood film industry in 2012, she appeared in over 160 movies, she has also produced number of movie such as Asalina (My Origin), and Uwar Gulma (Mother of Gossip). she was of the opinion that she had never slept with a producer to get a role.

Awards

Filmography

See also
List of Nigerian actors
List of Nigerian film producers
List of Kannywood actors

References

1988 births
Nigerian film actresses
Hausa-language mass media
Living people
Actresses in Hausa cinema
21st-century Nigerian actresses
Hausa people
Nigerian film producers
Kannywood actors
People from Borno State